Green Lawn Abbey, built in 1927, is a historic mausoleum located at 700 Greenlawn Avenue in South Franklinton in Franklin Township, near Columbus, Ohio. On June 27, 2007, it was added to the National Register of Historic Places.

History
Green Lawn Abbey is a mausoleum built in 1927 by the Columbus Mausoleum Company. At the time it was the largest in the area, with room for 600 interments. The Columbus Mausoleum Company built numerous other mausoleums in the surrounding area but Green Lawn Abbey was its largest.

Marble faux-fireplaces, stained glass windows and various religious statues adorn this beautiful final resting place of many notable figures in Ohio and local history.

In recent years, the Abbey has fallen victim to water leaks, which have damaged much of the plaster ceilings and marble floors.  The Abbey has also become the target for many urban exploration groups and vandals.  Many of the irreplaceable stained glass windows have been destroyed as people have attempted to find entry into or exit from the Abbey.  Marble statues lie broken, used as "tools" for breaking open windows and doors.

Notable residents include George J. Karb (former Franklin County police commissioner and five-time mayor of Columbus), magician Howard Thurston, Charles Foster Johnson (first real estate tycoon in the area), Isaac Collins (founder of Anchor Hocking), Edward and Rollin Swisher (from the company that manufactures Swisher Sweets cigars), and H. R. Penney (brother of J.C. Penney of department store fame). A special family crypt room holds members of the Lewis Sells family (owners of Sells Brothers Circus).

In 2001 trustees for Green Lawn Abbey considered selling its already reduced grounds to a nearby construction implement dealer that would have surrounded the building with a dealer lot for back hoes and heavy equipment.  The plan failed, but concerns continue, especially by fans of Thurston.

Restoration efforts
In August 2008 the Green Lawn Abbey Preservation Association (GLAPA) was incorporated as a 501(c)(3) recognized non-profit organization. This group has been leading efforts to restore the Abbey and preserve its historical significance to the city of Columbus. GLAPA is working to educate the community on the history of the Abbey through historic re-enactments held at the facility each fall and an open house event on Memorial Day. GLAPA is also working closely with the Columbus Landmarks Foundation to seek out restoration opportunities and grants for repair to the Abbey.

In October 2009, the Abbey suffered a setback when thieves broke in and stole a number of bronze gates. The remaining gates were removed and placed in secure storage until further restoration takes place.

As of December 2010, two major roof repair projects have been completed.

See also
Green Lawn Cemetery, Columbus, Ohio, nearby but not related
:Category:Burials at Green Lawn Abbey

References

Mausoleums on the National Register of Historic Places
National Register of Historic Places in Franklin County, Ohio
Franklinton (Columbus, Ohio)
Death in Ohio
1927 establishments in Ohio
Neoclassical architecture in Ohio
Buildings and structures completed in 1927